Henry Maston Mullinnix (July 4, 1892 – November 24, 1943) was a  United States Navy aviator and admiral who served in World War I and was killed in action commanding a Navy escort carrier division and task force group in the Gilbert Islands location during World War II. He was one of five flag officers of the U.S. Navy to die in World War II after Isaac C. Kidd, Norman Scott, Daniel J. Callaghan, and Theodore E. Chandler.

Biography
Mullinnix was born in Spencer, Indiana in 1892. He was president of his senior class at Attica High School graduating in 1909. He graduated first in his class from the United States Naval Academy in 1916. After flight training at Naval Air Station Pensacola, Florida, he was designated a naval aviator on January 11, 1924. He was one of those mainly responsible for developing the air-cooled engine for naval aircraft. On November 13, 1942, he was promoted to rear admiral.

Mullinnix commanded Saratoga from April 1943, until August 22, when he was transferred to duty with a carrier division. On November 24, Rear Admiral Mullinnix was on board his flagship  (under the command of Captain Irving Wiltsie) commanding Carrier Division 24 and Task Group 52.3 (Air Support Group of Northern Attack Force (Makin)-Task Group 52) when the escort carrier/flagship which had just participated in the Battle of Makin was torpedoed by a Japanese submarine and sunk off Makin Island, in the Gilbert Islands. Declared dead a year later, he was posthumously awarded the Legion of Merit: 

For exceptional meritorious conduct...as Commander of a Carrier Air Support Group prior to and during the amphibious invasion of Japanese-held Makin Atoll, Gilbert Islands from November 1 to 24, 1943. Displaying outstanding initiative and superior executive ability, Rear Admiral Mullinnix skillfully conducted anti-submarine and air combat patrols supporting our landing operations on this strongly defended island and, through his brilliant leadership, enabled escort carriers to carry out a well coordinated, aggressive attack against the enemy. Rear Admiral Mullinnix's tireless efforts, meticulous attention to detail and loyal devotion to the accomplishment of an extremely difficult and hazardous mission contributed materially to our subsequent capture of this strategic area.

Namesake
In 1957, the destroyer  was named in his honor.

See also

References

External links

1892 births
1943 deaths
People from Spencer, Indiana
Recipients of the Legion of Merit
United States Navy rear admirals
United States Naval Academy alumni
United States Navy World War II admirals
United States Navy personnel of World War I
United States Navy personnel killed in World War II
People from Attica, Indiana
Military personnel from Indiana
MIT School of Engineering alumni